William L. Tate (born c. 1932) is a former American football player and coach.  He served as the head football coach at  Wake Forest University from 1964 to 1968, compiling a record of 17–32–1.  Tate is a graduate of Mattoon High School in Mattoon, Illinois. Tate played college football as a fullback at the University of Illinois at Urbana–Champaign from 1950 to 1952. He was the MVP of the 1952 Rose Bowl, rushing for 150 yards on 20 carries with two touchdowns as Illinois defeated Stanford, 40–7.

Head coaching record

References

1930s births
Living people
American football fullbacks
Illinois Fighting Illini football coaches
Illinois Fighting Illini football players
Wake Forest Demon Deacons football coaches
People from Mattoon, Illinois
Players of American football from Illinois